MarcEdit is a metadata editing software suite used primarily to create and manipulate MARC records.  Originally developed by Terry Reese in 1999 for a major database cleanup project at Oregon State University, the software was subsequently released for wider use in the LIS field. As of 2011, it was used in 143 different countries.

Use cases
 MarcEdit can be used with XSLT to retrieve records from remote servers via Z39.50 and then map their contents to another metadata schema.
 Catalogers can use MarcEdit's implementation of the OCLC Worldcat API to read and write records in WorldCat.
 MarcEdit can be used to batch-edit authority records.
 MarcEdit can add dereferencable URIs to bibliographic records that use authority control that uniquely identify the relevant authority record.

References

External links
 Official site

Library cataloging and classification
Library and information science software